is a Japanese film and television actor.

Career
He has appeared in over 20 television productions and ten films in Japan and other countries as well.

Takashima appeared as Daisuke Matoba in the 2008 film L: Change the World (also known as Death Note: L Change the World) (2008).

Filmography

Films

Television
Taiheiki (1991), Ashikaga Tadayoshi
Hideyoshi (1996), Toyotomi Hidenaga
Tenchijin (2009), Higuchi Sōemon
Prison School (2015), Chairman of the board
Sanada Maru (2016), Hōjō Ujimasa
Shizumanu Taiyō (2016)
Black Leather Notebook (2017), Tsuneo Hashida
Yuri's World (2017), Polar Bear
Ieyasu, Edo wo Tateru (2019)
The Grand Family (2021)
Chimudondon (2022), Kōji Futatsubashi

Personal life
Takashima is the son of actor Tadao Takashima and actress Hanayo Sumi, and younger brother of actor Masahiro Takashima.

References

External links
 

Japanese male film actors
Japanese male television actors
Seijo University alumni
Living people
1966 births